David Lee (born September 4, 1990) is a former professional Canadian football defensive end. He signed as a free agent with the Toronto Argonauts on May 30, 2012, and spent two seasons with them. Lee was a member of the 100th Grey Cup winning team. He also played college football for the Western Ontario Mustangs. During his time at the University of Western Ontario, Lee was an Academic All Canadian, a first team OUA All-Star, a member of Team World during the Pro Bowl in 2010, and Western's Defensive MVP in 2012. Lee was released by the Saskatchewan Roughriders on February 13, 2015.

References

External links
Toronto Argonauts profile page
Saskatchewan Roughriders bio

1990 births
Canadian football defensive linemen
Living people
Players of Canadian football from Ontario
Sportspeople from London, Ontario
Toronto Argonauts players
Saskatchewan Roughriders players
Western Mustangs football players